Marcelle Sharron Ahtone Harjo (born 1945) is a Kiowa painter from Oklahoma. Her Kiowa name, Sain-Tah-Oodie, translates to "Killed With a Blunted Arrow." In the 1960s and 1970s, she and sister Virginia Stroud were instrumental in the revival of ledger art, a Plains Indian narrative pictorial style on  paper or muslin.

Background
Sharron Ahtone Harjo's parents were Evelyn Tahome and Jacob Ahtone. Evelyn's parents were A. Jane Goombi and Stephen "Tahome" Poolant. Jacob served as Kiowa Tribal chairman from 1978 to 1980. Jacob's parents were Tahdo (Tah'ga-da) and Samuel Ahtone. Samuel attended the Hampton Institute in Virginia and the Carlisle Indian Industrial School in Pennsylvania. Samuel was a ledger artist.

Her great-grandmother, Millie Durgan, was taken captive by the Kiowas as a young girl. Durgan acculturated into Kiowa society and became a renowned cradleboard-maker.

In 1963, Ahtone Harjo graduated from Billings West High School in Billings, Montana. She studied art under Southern Cheyenne artist Dick West at Bacone College in Muskogee, Oklahoma, from 1963 to 1965. In 1965, she earned her AA from Bacone and earned her BA from Northeastern State University in Tahlequah, Oklahoma.

In 1965, Ahtone Harjo was chosen as Miss Indian America.

Art career
Sharron Ahtone Harjo paints in acrylic, oil, gouache, and watercolor. In the 1970s, Ahtone began showing her work professionally. Due to the lack of acceptance for women artists in her area and nationally, she exhibited under the name Ahtone Harjo. She later taught art in schools.

Ahtone Harjo views Kiowa Sun Dance as one of her most important works because of her use of primary sources such as calendars, ledger drawings, and interviews with community members to complete the work. This painting is one of the only historical records of the annual ceremonial Sun Dance in which the entire tribe participated. The dance has not been performed since 1887. The painting took her several years to complete.

Personal
Ahtone Harjo primarily lives in Oklahoma City, Oklahoma, although she also stays in Santa Fe, New Mexico, and is from the Zoltone District 2 of the Kiowa tribal nation. Her sister is Deborah Ahtone, a Kiowa visual artist and writer. Sharron is married to Amos Harjo (Seminole/Muscogee). Their daughter Tahnee Ahtoneharjo-Growingthunder is a beadwork and textile artist, and curator. Ahtone Harjo is the mother-in-law to artist George Growingthunder, son of Joyce Growing Thunder Fogarty.

Public collections
Sharron Ahtone Harjo's work can be found in the following public collections.

 Brown University
 Center of the American Indian, Kilpatrick Center
 Center for Great Plains Studies, University of Nebraska
 Haffenreffer Museum of Anthropology
 Oklahoma State Historical Society
Southern Plains Indian Museum

Art works 

 Return Them Safely to Home (1971)
 Woman on Red (1976)
 Kiowa Sun Dance (1981)
 One Daughter of the Earth (1985)
 Looking for Kiowas (1985)
 Last Will and Testament (2005)

Published works
 Hail, Barbara, Everett R. Rhoades, and Sharron Ahtone-Harjo. Gifts of Price and Love: Kiowa and Comanche Cradles. Norman: University of Oklahoma Press, 2001. .
Pearce, Richard, Sharron Ahtone-Harjo. Women and Ledger Art: Four Contemporary Native American Artists. University of Arizona Press, Jun 13, 2013

Notes

References
 Clark, Blue. Indian Tribes of Oklahoma: A Guide. Norman: University of Oklahoma Press, 2009. .
 Lester, Patrick D. The Biographical Directory of Native American Painters. Norman: University of Oklahoma Press, 1995. .
 Pearce, Richard. Women and Ledger Art: Four Contemporary Native American Artists. Tucson: University of Arizona Press, 2013. .

External links 
 The Ledger Art of Sharron Ahtone Harjo, by Richard Pearce
Oral History with Sharron Ahtone Harjo

1945 births
21st-century American women artists
American women painters
Artists from Oklahoma City
Bacone College alumni
Kiowa people
Living people
Native American painters
Northeastern State University alumni
Painters from Oklahoma
People from Carnegie, Oklahoma
20th-century Native American women
20th-century Native Americans
21st-century Native American women
21st-century Native Americans
Native American women artists